Singles – 45's and Under is a compilation album by Squeeze, released on the A&M Records label on 22 October 1982. The album consisted of all their singles from 1978 to 1982 in chronological order, with the exception of "Bang Bang", "Christmas Day" and "When the Hangover Strikes", and included a new song, "Annie Get Your Gun", which was released as a single ahead of the album. It was the band's biggest selling album, having been certified platinum in both the UK and the US.

Additionally, it included the US single version of "Goodbye Girl", which features slightly different lyrics from both the album and UK single versions. The US version of the album substituted "If I Didn't Love You" for "Labelled with Love".

Reception 

AllMusic gave the album five stars, and their reviewer Chris Woodstra praised the collection as proof that Squeeze were "a great singles act – among the finest of the era".

Track listing
All tracks written and composed by Chris Difford and Glenn Tilbrook.

Side one
 "Take Me I'm Yours" – 2:48
 "Goodbye Girl" (US single version) – 3:05
 "Cool for Cats" – 3:10
 "Up the Junction" – 3:10
 "Slap and Tickle" – 4:16
 "Another Nail in My Heart" – 2:55
 "Pulling Mussels (from the Shell)" – 4:00

Side two
 "Labelled with Love" – 4:34 / "If I Didn't Love You" (US) – 4:10
 "Is That Love" – 2:30
 "Tempted" – 4:00
 "Black Coffee in Bed" – 6:10
 "Annie Get Your Gun" – 3:22

Charts

Certifications

References

A&M Records compilation albums
Squeeze (band) albums
1982 compilation albums